Erwin Alois Robert Leder (born 30 July 1951 in St. Pölten, Lower Austria, Austria) is an Austrian actor. He is best known for his role as Chief Mechanic Johann in  Das Boot, a 1982 feature film directed by Wolfgang Petersen about a mission of one World War II U-boat and its crew. He is also known for the leading role as the nameless serial killer in the highly acclaimed cult film Angst, by Gerald Kargl, which was banned all over Europe for extreme violence in 1983.

In 2003, Leder appeared as the lycan scientist Singe in the gothic horror/action film Underworld. He reprised his role in the sequel in a brief cameo as a corpse.

Filmography

References

1951 births
Living people
Austrian male television actors
Austrian male film actors
20th-century Austrian male actors
21st-century Austrian male actors
People from Sankt Pölten